A Beautiful Time is the 72nd solo studio album by Willie Nelson, released on April 29, 2022 on his 89th birthday. Produced by Buddy Cannon, the album includes original songs by Nelson, as well as covers of the Beatles and Leonard Cohen.

On February 10, 2022, Nelson released the single "I'll Love You Till the Day I Die" a song written by Chris Stapleton and Rodney Crowell. 

A Beautiful Time won the Grammy Award for Best Country Album at the 65th Annual Grammy Awards while Crowell and Stapleton's lead single "I'll Love You Till the Day I Die" was a nominee in the Best Country Song category at the same awards.

Critical reception

A Beautiful Time received positive reviews from music critics. At Metacritic, which assigns a normalized rating out of 100 to reviews from mainstream critics, the album received a score of 84 out of 100 based on four reviews, indicating "universal acclaim." 

Stephen Thomas Erlewine at AllMusic praised the record's "earned wisdom and wry humor," concluding that "it's still a marvel to hear him find sustenance and surprises within his music". Liz Thomson of The Arts Desk called the album "classic Nelson"  while No Depression, though acknowledging that the remote recording meant that the musicians performed without "other players to bounce off", praised Nelson's vocals and guitar playing and gave their verdict that it "is a delightful album from beginning to end". Veteran critic Robert Christgau ranked it as the fourth best album of 2022.

Track listing

Personnel

Performance
Barry Bales – upright bass
Jim "Moose" Brown – piano, B-3 organ, synthesizer, Wurlitzer
Buddy Cannon – background vocals
Melonie Cannon – background vocals
Chad Cromwell – drums
Fred Eltringham – drums, percussion
Kevin "Swine" Grant – upright bass
Mike Johnson – steel guitar
Catherine Marx – Wurlitzer, piano, B-3 organ
James Mitchell – electric guitar
Willie Nelson – lead vocals, Trigger
Mickey Raphael – harmonica
Bobby Terry – acoustic guitar, electric guitar, steel guitar, bass, piano
Lonnie Wilson – drums, percussion

Production
Buddy Cannon – production
Tony Castle – recording, mixing
Steve Chadie – recording
Shannon Finnegan – production coordinator
Andrew Mendelson – mastering

Other personnel
Frank Harkins – art direction and design
Pamela Springsteen – photography

Charts

References

Willie Nelson albums
2022 albums
Legacy Recordings albums
Albums produced by Buddy Cannon
Grammy Award for Best Country Album